The Palace of Domitian was built as Roman emperor Domitian's official residence in 81–92 AD and was used as such by subsequent emperors. Its remains sit atop and dominate the Palatine Hill in Rome, alongside other palaces.

The Palace is a massive structure separated today into three areas, in part following the way business matters and private life were separated so they could be conducted in parallel. The modern names used for these parts are: 
 the Domus Flavia
 the Domus Augustana
 the garden or "stadium".

It has not been fully exposed as parts lie under more recent buildings.

The palace was one of Domitian's many architectural projects including renovation of the Circus Maximus, renovation of the Pantheon, and three temples deifying his family members: the temple of Vespasian and Titus, the Porticus Diuorum, and the Temple of the gens Flavia.

History

The palace was designed by the architect Rabirius. It was built on top of earlier buildings, notably Nero's Domus Transitoria and the Republican House of the Griffins, significant remains of which have been discovered.

Under Septimius Severus a large extension was added along the southwestern slope of the hill overlooking the Circus Maximus, but otherwise the bulk of the Palace as constructed under Domitian remained remarkably intact for the remainder of the Empire. The Palace functioned as the official residence of the Roman Emperors until the fall of the Western Roman Empire in the 5th century AD.

Domus Flavia

The Domus Flavia is the public wing of the Palace.

Domus Augustana

The Domus Augustana was believed to be the private wing of the palace.

The Garden or "stadium"

The so-called "Hippodrome" or "Stadium" of Domitian  (160 x 48 m) extends over the entire eastern side of the Domus Augustana. It has the appearance of a Roman Circus but is too small to accommodate chariots. It was in reality a huge and elaborate sunken garden and most of the statuary in the nearby Palatine museum comes from the Stadium. Domitian liked this form of garden as shown by the one he also built at his country villa in the Alban Hills. It may have been used as a private riding school which must have been present in the private villas of the time, according to Pliny the Younger; in the Acts of the Martyrs, a Hippodromus Palatii is mentioned concerning Saint Sebastian, which must certainly have been this. 

On the eastern side is a large semi-circular exedra on three levels which was decorated with sculptures and fountains and commanded views of the garden below, with a belvedere on the top of its concrete dome.
Around the perimeter ran a two-storey portico carried on slender columns veneered in expensive coloured marble, the lower level of which was a sheltered promenade and with an elaborate stuccoed roof vault.

History

The stadium was the last section of the palace to be built after the first two parts were completed in 92 AD. It replaced older buildings dating from the Roman Republic to Nero.

Brick stamps show that Hadrian reinforced the structure of the porticos and that in the Severan era
the exedra was reduced to a quarter circle externally when the adjacent Severan Baths were built. The small oval enclosure in the southern end dates to the time of Theodoric (early 6th c.) when it was perhaps used as a private amphitheatre (certainly not as a training ground for gladiators, as this type of show was abolished since the time of Honorius).

The complex was discovered and excavated in the 18th century which was soon followed by looting which irreparably compromised the state of the building.

See also
 List of ancient monuments in Rome

References

Other sources
 Fred S. Kleiner. A History of Roman Art. Wadsworth Publishing. 1st Edition. 2007. Chapter 13 Page 187.
 Filippo Coarelli, Rome and surroundings, an archaeological guide, University of California Press, London, 2007

External links
 High-resolution 360° Panoramas and Images of Palace of Domitian | Art Atlas

Palatine Hill
Ancient palaces in Rome
Domitian